Bernhard Rapkay (born 8 January 1951 in Ludwigsburg)
is a German politician who served as a Member of the European Parliament from 1994 until 2014. He is a member of the Social Democratic Party of Germany, part of the Socialist Group.

During his time parliament, Rapkay sat on the European Parliament's Committee on Economic and Monetary Affairs. He was also a substitute for the Committee on Industry, Research and Energy, a member of the Delegation to the EU-Ukraine Parliamentary Cooperation Committee and a substitute for the Delegation for relations with the countries of Southeast Asia and the Association of Southeast Asian Nations (ASEAN).

Previous employment
 Various jobs in adult education, public relations, and project management

Career
 1991-1999: Various offices with the SPD (since 1975), including Chairman of the Dortmund SPD
 1991-1999: Member of the Western Westphalia District Executive
 Member of the SPD Regional Executive of the North Rhine-Westphalia
 Member of the SPD Regional Presidium, North Rhine-Westphalia
 Vice-Chairman of the SPD Federal Party Council
 Chairman of the SPD group, European Parliament

See also
2004 European Parliament election in Germany

External links
 
 
 

1951 births
Living people
MEPs for Germany 2004–2009
Social Democratic Party of Germany MEPs
MEPs for Germany 1994–1999
MEPs for Germany 1999–2004
MEPs for Germany 2009–2014